This is a list of cities, towns, villages and hamlets in County Antrim, Northern Ireland. See the List of places in Northern Ireland for places in other counties.

Towns are listed in bold.

A
Aghagallon
Aghalee
Ahoghill
Aldergrove
Antrim
Armoy
Aughafatten

B
Ballintoy
Ballybogy
Ballycarry
Ballycastle
Ballyclare
Ballycraigy
Ballyeaston
Ballygalley
Ballyhenry
Ballylinney
Ballymacash
Ballymena
Ballymoney 
Ballynure
Ballyrobert
Ballystrudder
Ballyvoy
Balnamore
Barmeen
Belfast (has city status)
Bendooragh
Broomhedge
Broughshane
Buckna
Bushmills

C
Capecastle
Cargan
Carnalbanagh
Carncastle
Carnlough
Carnmoney
Carrickfergus
Clogh
Cloughmills
Cogry-Kilbride
Connor
Craigarogan
Crumlin
Cullybackey
Cushendall
Cushendun

D
Dervock
Derrymore
Doagh
Donegore
Drains Bay
Drumlough
Dunadry
Dunamuggy
Dundrod
Dunloy
Dunmurry
Dunseverick

G
Galgorm Parks
Gawley's Gate
Glenarm
Glenavy
Glengormley
Glenoe
Glynn
Gracehill
Grange Corner
Greenisland
Groggan

J
Jordanstown

K
Kells-Connor
Kellswater
Keshbridge
Killead
Knocknacarry

L
Lambeg
Larne
Lisburn
Lisnagarvey
Loanends
Longkesh
Loughguile
Loughlynch
Lower Ballinderry
Lower Broomhedge
Lurganure
Lurganville

M
Maghaberry
Magheramorne
Mallusk
Martinstown
Maze
Mill Bay
Millbank
Milltown (near Belfast)
Mill Town (near Antrim)
Moneyglass
Monkstown
Moss-Side
Mounthill
Mullaghboy

N
Newtown Crommelin
Newtownabbey

P
Parkgate
Portballintrae
Portbraddon
Portglenone
Portrush

R
Randalstown
Rasharkin
Rathcoole
Roughfort

S
Solar
Stoneyford
Straid
Stranocum

T
Templepatrick
Tobergill
Toome
Tullynacross

U
Upper Ballinderry

W
Waterfoot
Whiteabbey
Whitehead

See also
List of civil parishes of County Antrim
List of townlands in County Antrim

Places
Antrim
Places